The 24th Arabian Gulf Cup was the 24th edition of the biennial football competition for the eight members of the Arab Gulf Cup Football Federation. Eight teams participated in the tournament.

On 15 July 2019, the AGCFF announced that the tournament would be held in Qatar from 24 November to 6 December 2019.

Bahrain won the competition by a 1–0 victory against Saudi Arabia to secure their first title.

Teams

On 12 November 2019, the national teams of Bahrain, Saudi Arabia and the United Arab Emirates decided to participate in the competition after boycotting it earlier.

Officials

Referees 
 Ammar Ebrahim Mahfoodh (Bahrain)
 Ali Abdulnabi Al Samaheeji (Bahrain)
 Alexandre Boucaut (Belgium)
 Ali Shaban (Kuwait)
 Ahmad Al-Ali (Kuwait)
 Abdullah Jamali (Kuwait)
 Mohanad Qasim Sarray (Iraq)
 Ali Sabah Adday Al Qaysi (Iraq)
 Ryuji Sato (Japan)
 Ahmed Al-Kaf (Oman)
 Omar Al Yaqoubi (Oman)
 Lionel Tschudi (Switzerland)
 Mohammed Abdulla Hassan Mohamed (United Arab Emirates)
 Ammar Al-Jeneibi (United Arab Emirates)
 Khamis Al Marri (Qatar)

Assistant Referees
 Yaser Tulefat (Bahrain)
 Salah Abdulaziz Janahi (Bahrain)
 Karel De Rocker (Belgium)
 Florian Lemaire (Belgium)
 Abbas Gholoum (Kuwait)
 Humoud Al-Sahli (Kuwait)
 Hayder Ubaydee (Iraq)
 Maytham Al Gburi (Iraq)
 Akane Yagi (Japan)
 Osamu Nonura (Japan)
 Abu Bakar Al Amri (Oman)
 Saif Al Ghafri (Oman)
 Jan Köbeli (Switzerland)
 Mohamed Ahmed Al Hammadi (United Arab Emirates)
 Hasan Mohamed Al Mahri (United Arab Emirates)
 Ramzan Saeed Al-Naemi (Qatar)
 Mohammad Dharman (Qatar)

Squads

Group stage
All times are local (UTC+03:00).

Group A

Group B

Knockout stage

 Time listed are UTC+3:00
 In the knockout stage, extra time and a penalty shoot-out were used to decide the winner if necessary.

Bracket

Semi-finals

Final

Winner

Goalscorers

1 goal

 Abdulla Al-Haza'a
 Ali Madan
 Jasim Al-Shaikh
 Mohamed Al Romaihi
 Mohamed Marhoon
 Alaa Abbas
 Alaa Abdul Zahra
 Ibrahim Bayesh
 Mohanad Ali
 Ahmed Al-Dhefiri
 Ahmed Zanki 
 Sami Al-Sanea
 Mubarak Al-Faneni
 Rabia Al-Alawi
 Abdulaziz Hatem
 Almoez Ali
 Abdullah Al-Ahrak
 Boualem Khoukhi
 Hassan Al-Haydos
 Mohammed Al-Khabrani

Team statistics 
This table shows all team performance.

Broadcasting rights
Below are the TV channels that broadcast the matches:

References 

 
Arabian Gulf Cup
Arabian Gulf Cup
Arabian Gulf Cup
2019
Arabian Gulf Cup
Arabian Gulf Cup